Polikarpov BDP-2 was a Soviet transport glider developed by Polikarpov during World War II.

Design
After Polikarpov's initial design for an assault glider, given the designation BDP (Boyevoi Desantnyi Planer – troops assault glider), to compete with the Antonov A-7 and Gribovskii G-11 was rejected, the design was re-surrected, in modified form, in 1942, as the BDP-2.

The BDP-2 was an all-wood high wing glider capable of carrying 20 troops and a pilot. The BDP-2 took-off on jettisonable twin wheel dollies and landed on large wooden skids either side of the fuselage.

Specifications

References

1940s Soviet military transport aircraft
BDP-2
High-wing aircraft
Aircraft first flown in 1941
1940s military gliders